Ivargal Indiyargal is a 1987 Indian Tamil-language film directed by Om Sakthi S. Jagadhesan, starring Ramarajan, Madhuri and Lakshmi. It was released on 10 July 1987.

Plot

Cast 
Ramarajan as Ramu
Madhuri as Savitri
Lakshmi
Senthil
Thyagu
Omakuchi Narasimhan

Soundtrack 
The music was composed by Manoj–Gyan, with lyrics by Vaali.

Reception 
The Indian Express wrote the film "has inklings of idealism and that its strong point". Jeyamanmadhan of Kalki appreciated the film's songs and dialogues.

References

External links 
 

1980s Tamil-language films
1987 films
Films scored by Manoj–Gyan